Prairie Grove is a city in Washington County, Arkansas, United States. The population was 4,380 at the 2010 Census. It is part of the Northwest Arkansas region, and home to Prairie Grove Battlefield State Park.

History
Prairie Grove was the site of the Battle of Prairie Grove during the American Civil War.  Confederate forces under General Thomas C. Hindman attempted to prevent the juncture of two Federal forces under Generals James G. Blunt and Francis J. Herron.  The result of the battle was a tactical stalemate which assured permanent Union control of northwest Arkansas.  The battlefield is now a State Military Park.

A post office has been in operation at Prairie Grove since 1867. Prairie Grove was platted in 1877. A 100-foot wind turbine near Prairie Grove was installed in the early 2000s.
 
The Natural Resources Defense Council released an issue paper stating between that 1997 and 2001, Prairie Grove was the center of a cluster of testicular cancer cases. No clear cause has been identified but the NRDC notes the town is near a closed nuclear reactor and a low-level radioactive landfill.  Arsenic from industrialized chicken manure is another possible source.  In 2004, residents sued one of the poultry farms and the poultry feed manufacturer for spreading contaminated manure throughout Prairie Grove. The lawsuit did not assign blame and the cause of the cancer cluster has never been definitively determined.

Geography

Demographics

2020 census

As of the 2020 United States census, there were 7,045 people, 2,175 households, and 1,596 families residing in the city.

2010 census
As of the census of 2010, there were 4,380 people, 1,658 households, and 1,197 families residing in the city. The racial makeup of the city was 91.08% White, 0.80% Black or African American, 2.90% Native American, 0.70% Asian, 0.10% Pacific Islander, 1.50% from other races, and 2.10% from two or more races.  4.50% of the population were Hispanic or Latino of any race.

There were 1,658 households, out of which 36.6% had children under the age of 18 living with them, 56.1% were married couples living together, 12.4% had a female householder with no husband present, and 27.8% were non-families. 40.0% of all households were made up of individuals, and 24.5% had someone living alone who was 65 years of age or older.  The average household size was 2.64 and the average family size was 3.11.

Infrastructure 

 U.S. Route 62

Arts and culture
The annual Clothesline Fair has taken place in Prairie Grove to celebrate local artists and craftspeople since 1951. An early fair merged with popular Labor Day festivities and annual reunions of the descendants of Confederate soldiers that took place at Prairie Grove Battlefield State Park. A Square dance has been included since 1958, now known as the Peggy Parks Memorial Square Dance Competition.
 
The two most well known attractions in Prairie Grove are the Prairie Grove Battlefield State Park and the Telephone Booth, a working  1960 phonebooth across the street from the park. The city also has several historical buildings including North Mock Street as well as the Southern Mercantile Building.

Education
Prairie Grove School District is separated into four different schools; Prairie Grove Elementary, Middle, Junior High and High School facilities. The school mascot is The Tigers. The school colors are Black, Gold, and White.

Notable residents
Jalen Beeks, pitcher for Arkansas Razorbacks baseball from 2013 to 2014, and in Major League Baseball from 2018–present
Maupin Cummings, judge and politician, served in Arkansas General Assembly from 1935 to 1943
Mark Martin, Arkansas Secretary of State from 2011 to 2019 and member of the Arkansas House of Representatives for part of Washington County from 2005 to 2011; Prairie Grove resident
Margaret Pittman, a noted bacteriologist known for her work in helping to formulate and test the effectiveness of the whooping cough vaccine, as well as groundbreaking research into the immunology and microbiology of infectious diseases. She was born near Prairie Grove in 1902.

See also 
 List of municipalities in Arkansas
 National Register of Historic Places listings in Washington County, Arkansas

References

External links
City of Prairie Grove, Arkansas official website
 Encyclopedia of Arkansas History & Culture entry: Prairie Grove (Washington County)

 
1888 establishments in Arkansas
Cities in Arkansas
Cities in Washington County, Arkansas
Northwest Arkansas
Populated places established in 1888